Pinaxister is a genus of clown beetles in the family Histeridae. There are at least four described species in Pinaxister.

Species
These four species belong to the genus Pinaxister:
 Pinaxister decipiens (Horn, 1883)
 Pinaxister henricischmidti Reichensperger, 1939
 Pinaxister peninsularis (Mann, 1924)
 Pinaxister setiger (J. E. LeConte, 1860)

References

Further reading

 
 

Histeridae
Articles created by Qbugbot